Weissella ghanensis  is a bacterium from the genus of Weissella which has been isolated from fermented cocoa beans in Ghana.

References

 

Bacteria described in 2008
Weissella